Thora Bjorg Helga (born Þorbjörg Helga Þorgilsdóttir; 16 April 1989) is an Icelandic actress best known for starring in Ragnar Bragason's Metalhead. Helga won the 2014 Icelandic Academy Award for Best Actress for her role in the film which premiered at the Toronto International Film Festival in September 2013. She also starred in Baltasar Kormákur's film The Deep in 2013, earning her a 2013 Icelandic Academy Award Best Supporting Actress nomination. Helga also starred in the American film Autumn Lights.

For her role in Metalhead, Helga garnered unanimous acclaim for what The New York Times called "remarkable", playing a grief-stricken young woman in Iceland. The Village Voice concluded that Helga was "commanding in the grief-stricken lead role, nailing not only the power stances and other musical affectations the character demands but, more pressingly, the permeating sorrow".

Filmography

References

External links
 

1989 births
Icelandic film actresses
Icelandic television actresses
Living people
Actresses from Reykjavík
21st-century Icelandic actresses